Loser is the second extended play (EP) by American singer Sasha Alex Sloan. The EP was released by label RCA Records on November 29, 2018. The EP was primarily produced by American record producer King Henry, with additional production from musicians Emile Haynie and Emi Dragoi. The EP follows Sloan's debut EP, Sad Girl, released in April 2018. Additionally, Sloan performed the track "Older" on The Late Show with Stephen Colbert in February 2019.

Track listing

References

2018 EPs
Sasha Alex Sloan albums
RCA Records EPs
Albums produced by King Henry (producer)
Albums produced by Emile Haynie